Broughton River may refer to:

 Broughton River (Queensland), a river located in Queensland, Australia.
 Broughton River (South Australia), a river located in South Australia